M'Clintock Channel  (also spelled McClintock Channel) is located in the territory of Nunavut, Canada. The channel, an arm of the Arctic Ocean, divides Victoria Island from Prince of Wales Island. This channel is named after Sir Francis McClintock, an Irish explorer in the British Royal Navy, famous for his Canadian Arctic explorations.

The channel connects Ommanney Bay and Parry Channel to the northwest and Larsen Sound to the southeast. Umingmalik is on the southeast boundary of the channel.

References

External links
M'Clintock Channel (MC) at the Polar Bear Specialist Group

Victoria Island (Canada)
Channels of Kitikmeot Region